Kenneth Strath Moore (February 17, 1910 – December 8, 1981) was a Canadian ice hockey player who competed in the 1932 Winter Olympics. He is the first indigenous person to win an Olympic gold medal.

Early life 
Moore was born in Balcarres, Saskatchewan. He was one of Canada's first indigenous Olympians and a member of the Peepeekisis Cree Nation in Saskatchewan, although his parents were originally from Norway House Cree Nation in Northern Manitoba.

Career 
In 1932, he was a member of the Winnipeg Hockey Club, the Canadian team which won the gold medal. During the game, he played one match and scored one goal.

Personal life 
Moore married Edith Mae McDougall and has one daughter, two granddaughters and one great grandson. He died in Winnipeg, Manitoba.

External links
Kenneth Moore's profile at databaseOlympics
Kenneth Moore's profile at Sports Reference.com

1910 births
1981 deaths
Canadian ice hockey right wingers
Ice hockey players at the 1932 Winter Olympics
Olympic ice hockey players of Canada
Olympic gold medalists for Canada
Ice hockey people from Saskatchewan
Winnipeg Hockey Club players
Olympic medalists in ice hockey
Medalists at the 1932 Winter Olympics
First Nations sportspeople